Terence William Leighton MacDermot (September 13, 1896 – April 29, 1966) was a Canadian diplomat and academic.

Early Years
Born in Saint Andrew Parish, Colony of Jamaica to Henry Myles Fleetwood MacDermot and Mary Emily MacDermot (Langdon), MacDermot immigrated with family to Canada and grew up in Montreal, Quebec.

McGill and Service During World War I

He attended McGill University from 1913 to 1916 and received a Bachelor of Arts degree in 1917 while serving in the 7th Canadian (McGill) Siege Battery during World War I. As member of the 7th Canadian Siege Battery he was involved in the Battle of Vimy Ridge under the 44th Heavy Artillery Group of the 1st Canadian Division of the Canadian Expeditionary Force.

Post War, Rhodes Scholar and Academic Career
A Rhodes scholar, he received his Bachelor of Arts and Master of Arts degree in 1922 from New College, Oxford. From 1922 to 1923, he taught at Hotchkiss School in Connecticut. He returned to Montreal in 1923 where he taught at Lower Canada College and in McGill's history department. In 1929, he was appointed assistant professor. From 1925 to 1930, he was editor of the McGill News.

In 1934, he was appointed national secretary of the League of Nations Society in Canada. In 1935, he was appointed principal of Upper Canada College.

Service in World War II

During World War II, he served for the War Service Department, a major in the Canadian Intelligence Corps and then as a chief army examiner for the Military District 2 in Toronto. MacDermot would retired from active duty in 1945 as lieutenant colonel.

Diplomatic career
In 1944, he joined the Department of External Affairs and later served in various overseas posts:

 Canadian High Commissioner to South Africa from 1950 to 1954 
 Canadian Ambassador to Greece and Israel from 1954 to 1957
 Canadian High Commissioner to Australia from 1957 to 1961

Return to Academia
He taught political science at Bishop's University from 1961 to 1966.

He was given an honorary LL.D. degree from McGill in 1957.

Death

MacDermot died in Sherbrooke, Quebec on April 29, 1966, aged 69.

References

1896 births
1966 deaths
Alumni of New College, Oxford
Academic staff of Bishop's University
Canadian Rhodes Scholars
McGill University alumni
Academic staff of McGill University
Upper Canada College faculty
High Commissioners of Canada to South Africa
High Commissioners of Canada to Australia
Ambassadors of Canada to Israel
Ambassadors of Canada to Greece
Canadian military personnel of World War I
Canadian military personnel of World War II
People from Montreal
Anglophone Quebec people
Emigrants from British Jamaica to Canada
Colony of Jamaica people